Bebearia inepta, or Plowes' forester, is a butterfly in the family Nymphalidae. It is found in Ivory Coast. The habitat consists of forests.

References

Butterflies described in 2001
inepta
Endemic fauna of Ivory Coast
Butterflies of Africa